Siksika ottae is an extinct genus of petalodont (a type of prehistoric cartilaginous fish), which lived during the Upper Mississippian. It has been discovered at the well known Carboniferous-aged Bear Gulch Limestone (Montana, United States). It is known primarily from fossil teeth, but also from partial neurocranium and mandibles which hint at a close relationship to coeval petalodontiforms such as Janassa and Netsepoye. Dentition is generally heterodont. Siksika translates to Blackfoot, being named after the Siksika Nation.

References

Siksika ottae
Blackfoot (Siksika) The Canadian Encyclopedia

Mississippian fish of North America
Petalodontiformes
Fossil taxa described in 1989